Phil Bauhaus (born 8 July 1994 in Bocholt) is a German cyclist, who currently rides for UCI WorldTeam . He was named in the start list for the 2017 Giro d'Italia. In August 2018 it was confirmed that Bauhaus would join  for the 2019 season on an initial one-year contract. In August 2019, he was named in the startlist for the 2019 Vuelta a España.

Major results

2013
 1st Stage 1a Tour of Bulgaria
 1st Stage 2 Oder Rundfahrt
 6th Kernen Omloop Echt-Susteren
2014
 1st Skive–Løbet
 1st Kernen Omloop Echt-Susteren
 Volta a Portugal
1st Stages 1 & 6
 1st Stage 5 Baltic Chain Tour
 2nd Road race, National Under-23 Road Championships
 2nd Zuid Oost Drenthe Classic I
 3rd Road race, National Road Championships
 3rd Rund um Düren
 5th Himmerland Rundt
 7th Poreč Trophy
 7th Eschborn-Frankfurt City Loop U23
 7th Velothon Berlin
 8th Destination Thy
 8th Omloop van het Houtland
2015
 4th Nokere Koerse
2016
 1st Stage 5 Danmark Rundt
 1st Stage 1 Tour d'Azerbaïdjan
 1st Stage 2 Oberösterreich Rundfahrt
 4th Road race, UCI Under-23 Road World Championships
 4th Grote Prijs Stad Zottegem
 7th Münsterland Giro
 8th Rund um Köln
 10th Handzame Classic
 10th Kattekoers
2017
 1st Stage 5 Critérium du Dauphiné
 2nd Münsterland Giro
 4th Nokere Koerse
2018
 1st Stage 3 Abu Dhabi Tour
 6th London–Surrey Classic
2019
 1st Coppa Bernocchi
 1st Stage 1 Adriatica Ionica Race
2020
 1st  Overall Tour of Saudi Arabia
1st Stages 3 & 5
2021
 Tour de Hongrie
1st  Points classification 
1st Stages 1 & 3 
 Tour of Slovenia
 1st Stages 1 & 5
 1st Stage 1 Tour de Pologne
 1st Stage 4 Tour de la Provence
 1st Stage 1 CRO Race
2022
 1st Stage 7 Tirreno–Adriatico
 1st Stage 5 Tour de Pologne
 4th Eschborn–Frankfurt
 7th BEMER Cyclassics
2023
 1st Stage 1 Tour Down Under

Grand Tour general classification results timeline

References

External links

1994 births
Living people
German male cyclists
People from Bocholt, Germany
Sportspeople from Münster (region)
Cyclists from North Rhine-Westphalia